San Silvestro is a Romanesque style, Roman Catholic church in Alatri, province of Frosinone, in the region of Lazio, Italy. The church was dedicated to the Saint and Pope Sylvester I.

History and description
The 10-11th century church is built with stone with a single nave, to which a left nave and sacristy were added in 1331. The exterior has few windows, the apse retains fragments of a 12th-century fresco depicting St Sylvester and the Dragon. Other 13th and 14th century frescoes depict scenes from the gospels and saints. The 9th century crypt has ribbed ceilings and Byzantine-style frescoes.

References

Churches in the province of Frosinone
Romanesque architecture in Lazio
10th-century churches in Italy